Pete Waterman Entertainment (PWE) is the production company one-time pop and dance record label owned by British pop mogul Pete Waterman. The label, originally PWL (Pete Waterman Limited), is most famous for being the home of hit record producers Stock Aitken Waterman.

History
After producing many hits for other record companies, PWL launched its own label in 1987 (PWL Records) with the single  "I Just Can't Wait" by Mandy Smith. The next single was the biggest selling single of the year: "I Should Be So Lucky" by Kylie Minogue.

As a record label, PWL enjoyed success with Australian artists such as Kylie Minogue and Jason Donovan and Dutch dance group 2 Unlimited.  As a production house they produced hits for English artists such as Rick Astley, Dead or Alive and Bananarama on other record labels.

In the US, PWL America was established in 1989 and specialized primarily in hip-hop music, launching the careers of MCs Ed O.G. and Diamond D.
In 1992, it was renamed Chemistry Records Ltd., but it shut its doors in 1993. It was distributed in that territory by Mercury/PolyGram Records.

In the early 1990s, Pete Waterman formed a new label called PWL International in partnership with Warner Music; one of the artists that recorded for the label, Opus III, would score two number ones on Billboard’s Dance Club Songs Chart through a US deal with Warner’s EastWest Records. However, with other projects taking up Waterman's time, his involvement in the label decreased, and PWL International Ltd. became the Warner label Coalition.

The record label is still in operation today and operates the label EBUL through former labels Jive Records and Zomba (now labels by Sony Music Entertainment).

As of March 2017, most of the PWL catalogue is now distributed by BMG Rights Management.

Notable former PWL artists
Some of these acts were produced at the PWL Hit Factory and were signed to PWL Records, whilst others were licensed to PWL from other European independent dance labels (e.g. Media or Byte):
 Anticapella
 Jason Donovan (left in 1991)
 Kakko
 Kylie Minogue (left in 1992)
 Lonnie Gordon
 Loveland
 Mandy Smith 
 Mel & Kim
 Niki Evans
 One True Voice
 Opus III
 Pop!
 The Reynolds Girls
 Steps
 Strange Nature (left in 1995)
 Sybil
 Tina Cousins
 2 Unlimited
 Undercover

Acts produced by Stock Aitken Waterman
These acts were produced at the PWL Hit Factory, but were not signed directly to PWL Records:

 Bananarama (signed to London Records)
 Big Fun (left in 1991)
 Bobby Farrell, Maizie Williams and Marcia Barrett of Boney M. for the unauthorised single "Everybody Wants to Dance Like Josephine Baker"
 Boy Krazy
 Brother Beyond (signed to EMI's Parlophone label)
 Cliff Richard
 Dead or Alive (left in 1988) (signed to CBS' Epic Records, now Sony Music)
 Divine
 Donna Summer
 Hazell Dean
 London Boys
 Princess
 Rick Astley (left in 1990)
 Sabrina Salerno
 Samantha Fox
 Same Difference
 The Sheilas
 Sinitta
 Sonia (left in 1991)

Chemistry/PWL America artists
 Kim Appleby
 B.O.X.
 Diamond and the Psychotic Neurotics
 Ed O.G. & da Bulldogs
 Poizon Posse
 Sylk Smoov

See also
 Lists of record labels

References

External links

Stock Aitken Waterman & PWL at cafe80s

British record labels
Pop record labels
Electronic dance music record labels
Hi-NRG
Hip hop record labels
Record labels established in 1987
IFPI members